Lesley Margaret Morton (born 25 December 1963) is a New Zealand long-distance runner. She competed in the women's 10,000 metres at the 1992 Summer Olympics. She was born in Croydon, England.

International competitions

References

External links
 

1963 births
Living people
People from Croydon
New Zealand female long-distance runners
Athletes (track and field) at the 1992 Summer Olympics
Olympic athletes of New Zealand
World Athletics Championships athletes for Australia